The Thai Ambassador in Brasília is the official representative of the Government in Bangkok to the Government of Brazil.

History
From 1969 to  the Thai Ambassador to Brasilia was concurrently accredited in Lima.

List of representatives

References 

 
Brazil
Thailand